The 1959 Illinois Fighting Illini football team was an American football team that represented the University of Illinois during the 1959 Big Ten Conference football season In their 18th year under head coach Ray Eliot, the Illini compiled a 5–3–1 record and finished in a tie for third place in the Big Ten Conference.  After the season, guard Bill Burrell was selected as the team's most valuable player and also received the Chicago Tribune Silver Football trophy as the Big Ten's most valuable player.

Schedule

Awards and honors
 Bill Burrell (offensive guard)
Chicago Tribune Silver Football
Consensus All-American, (guard)

References

Illinois
Illinois Fighting Illini football seasons
Illinois Fighting Illini football